Marc Hennerici (born 10 May 1982 in Mayen) is a German auto racing driver. He is best known for being the first winner of the World Touring Car Championship's Independents Trophy, in 2005.

Racing career
Hennerici competed in Formula BMW from 1999 and 2001. In 2003 he won the Alfa Romeo 147 Cup in Germany. In 2004 he competed in the DMSB Produktionswagen Meisterschaft driving a BMW 320i for Wiechers-Sport, finishing fourth. He and Wiechers-Sport moved to the new World Touring Car Championship in 2005. Despite not scoring any points in the main championship when rival independent Tom Coronel scored 11, he still was able to win the Independents Trophy. In 2006 he finished fifth in the VLN series. He often competes in the 24 Hours of Nürburgring. He currently competes in ADAC GT Masters.

Racing record

Complete World Touring Car Championship results
(key) (Races in bold indicate pole position) (Races in italics indicate fastest lap)

Complete GT1 World Championship results

References

1982 births
Living people
People from Mayen
German racing drivers
Racing drivers from Rhineland-Palatinate
Formula BMW ADAC drivers
World Touring Car Championship drivers
FIA GT Championship drivers
FIA GT1 World Championship drivers
Blancpain Endurance Series drivers
ADAC GT Masters drivers
European Touring Car Championship drivers
24 Hours of Spa drivers

Phoenix Racing drivers
Nürburgring 24 Hours drivers
24H Series drivers